Sean Ian Pierson (born March 10, 1976) is a retired Canadian mixed martial artist. A professional from 1999 until 2013, he fought for the Ultimate Fighting Championship (UFC) and Bellator.

Background
Pierson began wrestling in the fourth grade and competed all the way through college, attending Brock University, and was a member of the Canadian National Team for the Greco-Roman and Freestyle categories. Pierson's other accomplishments in the sport include winning multiple national championships in the Greco-Roman category and a Canadian university national freestyle championship. Pierson also trained in judo during high school.

Mixed martial arts career

Bellator Fighting Championships
Pierson was set to compete in Bellator's Second Season Welterweight Tournament but an injury forced him out of the tournament. He was set to have his first fight against Dan Hornbuckle which would have taken place at Bellator 15.

Ultimate Fighting Championship
After TJ Waldburger had to pull out of his fight with Matthew Riddle at UFC 124 due to injury, it was announced on October 27 that Pierson had signed with the UFC to step in on short notice. After outstriking Riddle over three fast-paced rounds, Pierson won a unanimous decision (30–27, 30–27, 30–27). The fight was dubbed by Dana White as the real Fight of the Night.

Pierson was expected to face Brian Foster on April 30, 2011, at UFC 129.  However, Foster was forced out of the bout with an injury, and replaced by Jake Ellenberger. Pierson lost to Ellenberger via first-round KO after he was caught by a counter left.

Pierson fought Dong Hyun Kim on December 30, 2011, at UFC 141.
Pierson was defeated by Kim via unanimous decision (30-27, 30-27, 30-27).

Pierson defeated Jake Hecht by unanimous decision on June 8, 2012, at UFC on FX 3.

Pierson was expected to face Dan Miller on September 22, 2012, at UFC 152.  However, Miller pulled out of the bout after getting news about his son's kidney transplant operation  and was replaced by Lance Benoist. Pierson defeated Benoist via unanimous decision.

Pierson was expected to face Rick Story on March 16, 2013, at UFC 158. However, he was forced out of the bout with an injury and replaced by Quinn Mulhern.

Pierson was expected to face TJ Waldburger on June 15, 2013, at UFC 161.  However, Waldburger was pulled from the event and replaced by Kenny Robertson. Despite being hurt in the third round, Pierson won the fight by majority decision.

Personal life
Pierson lives in the town of Whitchurch-Stouffville north of downtown Toronto, is married and has two sons. Pierson has at least temporarily left his job at the Toronto police force, since they would not allow him to have a secondary source of income as a UFC fighter while being employed by the force. The police force was against Pierson's participation in these events because of the nickname "Pimp Daddy" he used in his early twenties.

Sean Pierson has been involved with several other UFC fighters (Sam Stout, Mark Hominick, and Matt Mitrione) as part of a Toronto area anti-bullying program.

Pierson is a top video game player having won tournaments and finishing third in a Canada Wonderland tournament.

Mixed martial arts record

|-
|Win
|align=center| 14–6
|Kenny Robertson
|Decision (majority)
|UFC 161
|
|align=center|3
|align=center|5:00
|Winnipeg, Manitoba, Canada
|
|-
|Win
|align=center| 13–6
|Lance Benoist
|Decision (unanimous)
|UFC 152
|
|align=center|3
|align=center|5:00
|Toronto, Ontario, Canada
|
|-
|Win
|align=center| 12–6
|Jake Hecht
|Decision (unanimous)
|UFC on FX: Johnson vs. McCall
|
|align=center|3
|align=center|5:00
|Sunrise, Florida, United States
| 
|-
|Loss
|align=center| 11–6
|Dong Hyun Kim
|Decision (unanimous)
|UFC 141
|
|align=center| 3
|align=center| 5:00
|Las Vegas, Nevada, United States
| 
|-
|Loss
|align=center| 11–5
|Jake Ellenberger
|KO (punches)
|UFC 129
|
|align=center| 1
|align=center| 2:42
|Toronto, Ontario, Canada
| 
|-
|Win
|align=center| 11–4
|Matthew Riddle
|Decision (unanimous)
|UFC 124
|
|align=center| 3
|align=center| 5:00
|Montreal, Quebec, Canada
| 
|-
|Win
|align=center| 10–4
|Ricky Goodall
|TKO (punches)
|W-1 New Ground
|
|align=center| 1
|align=center| 1:44
|Halifax, Nova Scotia, Canada
| 
|-
|Win
|align=center| 9–4
|Fabio Holanda
|KO (punches)
|Wreck MMA: Fight for the Troops
|
|align=center| 1
|align=center| 1:41
|Gatineau, Quebec, Canada
|Catchweight (173 lbs) bout.
|-
|Win
|align=center| 8–4
|Jason Rorison
|TKO (punches and knees to the body)
|Ringside MMA: Rage Fighting
|
|align=center| 1
|align=center| 3:57
|Montreal, Quebec, Canada
| 
|-
|Win
|align=center| 7–4
|Iraj Hadin
|TKO (punches)
|W-1 MMA 2: Unplugged
|
|align=center| 1
|align=center| 2:55
|Gatineau, Quebec, Canada
| 
|-
|Win
|align=center| 6–4
|Jacob MacDonald
|Submission (punches)
|TKO 35: Quenneville vs Hioki
|
|align=center| 1
|align=center| 1:45
|Montreal, Quebec, Canada
| 
|-
|Loss
|align=center| 5–4
|Jesse Bongfeldt
|TKO (punches)
|HCF: Unfinished Business
|
|align=center| 2
|align=center| 4:41
|Alberta, Canada
| 
|-
|Win
|align=center| 5–3
|Chester Post
|TKO (punches)
|TKO: MMA 2007 Tourney
|
|align=center| 1
|align=center| 1:52
|Victoriaville, Quebec, Canada
| 
|-
|Loss
|align=center| 4–3
|Steve Vigneault
|Decision (unanimous)
|TKO 13: Ultimate Rush
|
|align=center| 3
|align=center| 5:00
|Montreal, Quebec, Canada
| 
|-
|Win
|align=center| 4–2
|Mark Colangelo
|Submission (armbar)
|UCC 10: Battle for the Belts 2002
|
|align=center| 1
|align=center| 4:19
|Gatineau, Quebec, Canada
| 
|-
|Loss
|align=center| 3–2
|John Alessio
|KO (head kick)
|UCC 7: Bad Boyz
|
|align=center| 2
|align=center| 1:14
|Montreal, Quebec, Canada
| 
|-
|Win
|align=center| 3–1
|Ali Nestor Charles
|Submission (heel hook)
|UCC 3: Battle for the Belts
|
|align=center| 1
|align=center| 2:09
|Sherbrooke, Quebec, Canada
| 
|-
|Loss
|align=center| 2–1
|Chad Saunders
|Submission (heel hook)
|IFC: Warriors Challenge 8
|
|align=center| 1
|align=center| 1:11
|Friant, California, United States
| 
|-
|Win
|align=center| 2–0
|Steve Vigneault
|TKO (punches)
|IFC: Battleground 2000
|
|align=center| 1
|align=center| 1:17
|Kahnawake, Quebec, Canada
|Welterweight debut.
|-
|Win
|align=center| 1–0
|Steve Vigneault
|TKO (punches)
|IFC: Montreal Cage Combat
|
|align=center| 1
|align=center| 1:07
|Montreal, Quebec, Canada
|

See also
 List of male mixed martial artists
 List of Canadian UFC fighters

References

External links

1976 births
Living people
Brock University alumni
Canadian male mixed martial artists
Welterweight mixed martial artists
Mixed martial artists utilizing Greco-Roman wrestling
Mixed martial artists utilizing freestyle wrestling
Sportspeople from Toronto
Ultimate Fighting Championship male fighters
Canadian practitioners of Brazilian jiu-jitsu
People awarded a black belt in Brazilian jiu-jitsu